Leandro Almeida Silva may refer to:

Leandro Almeida Silva (footballer, born 1977), Brazilian footballer
Leandro Almeida Silva (footballer, born 1987), Brazilian footballer